Cercophonius queenslandae is a species of scorpion in the Bothriuridae family. It is native to Australia, where it occurs in eastern Queensland. It was first described in 1990 by Luis Acosta.

References

 

 
queenslandae
Scorpions of Australia
Endemic fauna of Australia
Fauna of Queensland
Animals described in 1990